Valea Șesii may refer to several places in Romania:

 Valea Șesii, a village in Bucium Commune, Alba County
 Valea Șesii, a village in Lupșa Commune, Alba County
 Valea Șesii (Arieș), a tributary of the Arieș in Alba County
 Valea Șesii, a tributary of the Iaz in Sălaj County